Lataunya Pollard Romanazzi (born 1959 or 1960) is a former college basketball player who played for Long Beach State from 1979 to 1983. With Long Beach, Pollard scored 3,001 points and was the 1983 recipient of the Wade Trophy. During this time period, Pollard played for the American team that qualified for the 1980 Summer Olympics before the United States withdrew from the event. While on the American team, Pollard won silver 1981 World University Games and 1983 FIBA World Championship for Women. Outside of America, Pollard played basketball in Europe from 1983 to the early 1990s. Pollard was inducted into the Women's Basketball Hall of Fame in 2001 and Indiana Basketball Hall of Fame in 2005.

Early life and education
In 1959 or 1960, Pollard was born in East Chicago, Indiana. Growing up, Pollard tried out for a high school basketball team when she was in grade eight. Upon being chosen for the team, Pollard had to wait a year before she could play as she was under the age requirement. While at East Chicago Roosevelt, Pollard was awarded the 1979 Indiana Miss Basketball. After 93 games, Pollard accumulated 1,739 points. In 1985, Pollard was third for the most points scored by a girls basketball player in Indiana.

Career
In 1979, Pollard started her college basketball career with Long Beach State. During the 1980 AIAW National Division I Basketball Championship, her team reached the quarterfinals. Her team also made it to the quarterfinals in the 1981 AIAW Divsion I event. As part of the NCAA, Pollard's team won the Western Collegiate Athletic Association conference in 1982. That year, Pollard reached 2000 career points in women's basketball. At the 1983 NCAA Division I women's basketball tournament, her team reached the regional finals. 

During her time at Long Beach, Pollard led the season in points four times and blocks three times. After ending her time with Long Beach in 1983, Pollard had appeared in 128 games and scored 3,001 points. That year, Pollard held the season and career points record as part of the 16 statistics she led with Long Beach. In 2022, Pollard continued to be first in career points record with Long Beach and had remained in first for almost forty years.

Pollard was named most valuable player at the 1979 U.S. Olympic Festival after she scored 82 points in the event. In international events, Pollard scored 72 points at the 1980 FIBA World Olympic Qualifying Tournament as part of the American team that qualified for the 1980 Summer Olympics. Pollard did not compete at the Olympics after the United States decided to not participate in the Games. While on the United States team, Pollard won a silver medal at the 1981 World University Games and 1983 FIBA World Championship for Women. In these events, Pollard scored 106 points at the World University Games and 88 points at the FIBA World Championship. Outside of the United States, Pollard began playing basketball in Italy in 1983 and continued to play there until 1991. While competing in Italy, Pollard consistently led in points each season include a 1985 points record of 39.5.

Long Beach State statistics

Source

Awards and honors
In 1982, Pollard was a co-recipient of the USA Basketball Female Athlete of the Year award alongside Cindy Noble. In 1983, she was nominated for the Naismith Trophy. That year, Pollard won the Wade Trophy for the best women's college basketball player. By 1990, Long Beach retired Pollard's jersey. For hall of fame inductions, Pollard was named into the Long Beach State Hall of Fame in 1988 and the Women's Basketball Hall of Fame in 2001. In 2005, she joined the Indiana Basketball Hall of Fame and the National High School Hall of Fame.

References

Date of birth missing (living people)
Long Beach State Beach women's basketball players
Living people